The Central Rio de Janeiro Atlantic Forest Mosaic ( is a protected area mosaic in the state of Rio de Janeiro, Brazil. The mosaic is inland, to the east of the city of Rio de Janeiro.

History

A project to create three new protected area mosaics in the Serra do Mar Ecological Corridor began in December 2005, coordinated by the National Council of the Atlantic Forest Biosphere Reserve.
These were the Bocaina Mosaic, Central Rio de Janeiro Atlantic Forest Mosaic and Mantiqueira Mosaic. Funding was provided by Conservation International, the Fund for the Global Environment Facility, the Government of Japan, the MacArthur Foundation and the World Bank. The Central Coastal Atlantic Forest Mosaic was recognized by the Ministry of the Environment on 11 December 2006. There were originally 22 conservation units in the mosaic. The strategic plan was developed in 2010.

Extent

The Central Rio de Janeiro Atlantic Forest Mosaic encompasses 14 municipalities: Bom Jardim, Cachoeiras de Macacu, Casimiro de Abreu, Duque de Caxias, Guapimirim, Itaboraí, Macaé, Magé, Miguel Pereira, Nova Friburgo, Nova Iguaçu, Petrópolis, Rio Bonito, São Gonçalo, São José do Vale do Rio Preto, Silva Jardim, Teresópolis and Tanguá.

Environment

The land in the lower regions was formed by sediments deposited by the rivers and the sea. In the coastal areas there are several meandering rivers that deposit fine sediment carried from the mountains, creating an ideal environment for the growth of mangroves, which are concentrated in the Guapimirim Environmental Protection Area and the Guanabara Ecological Station. Further from the shore there are patches of dense alluvial rainforest. Further back again this starts to merge into dense lowland and sub-montane rainforest in the Bacia do Rio Macacu, Guapi-Guapiaçu and Suruí environmental protection areas.

Further inland, as the land rises, there are fragments of dense montane forest, dense high montane forest and alpine meadows. To the north of the mosaic there are patches of submontane and montane seasonal forest. Originally the most common form of vegetation in the mosaic was dense lowland rainforest, followed by dense submontane and montane rainforest. The semideciduous montane forest and alpine meadows were the least common. The native vegetation has been subject to exploitation and destruction for several centuries.

Conservation units

Conservation units in the mosaic include:

Notes

Sources

Protected area mosaics of Brazil
Protected areas of Rio de Janeiro (state)
2006 establishments in Brazil
Protected areas of the Atlantic Forest